Martin Ford (born 13 December 1978) was an English cricketer. He was a right-handed batsman and a right-arm fast bowler who played for Dorset. He was born in Bournemouth, Dorset.

Ford made his Second XI Trophy debut in 2003, and made his only List A appearance the following season, in a heavy defeat at the hands of Yorkshire in the C&G Trophy.

Ford continued to represent Dorset on a regular basis between 2005 and 2007, and made two appearances for the team during the 2008 season.

External links
Martin Ford at Cricket Archive 

1978 births
Living people
English cricketers
Dorset cricketers
Sportspeople from Bournemouth
Cricketers from Dorset